"Don't Make Me Wait" is a song by English boy band 911. It was released in the United Kingdom on 28 October 1996 as the third single from their debut studio album, The Journey (1997). It debuted and peaked at number 10 on the UK Singles Chart and at number 65 on the German Singles Chart. The song was the first of a string of consecutive top 10 hit singles in the UK.

Critical reception
A reviewer from Music Week rated "Don't Make Me Wait" four out of five, adding, "A fun, mid-tempo pop track, which is another big step forward in the promising career of the three-piece boy band."

Track listings
 12" vinyl
 "Don't Make Me Wait" (Alex & Ber Project Version)
 "Don't Make Me Wait" (Smash Hits Version)

 CD single
 Don't Make Me Wait (Radio Edit) - 3:40
 Vision in My Mind - 4:34
 Carefree Lover - 4:00

 CD1
 Don't Make Me Wait (Radio Edit) - 3:40
 Vision in My Mind - 4:37 	
 Carefree Lover - 4:00

 CD2
 "Don't Make Me Wait" (Radio Edit) - 3:40
 "Don't Make Me Wait" (12" Extended) - 6:31
 "Don't Make Me Wait" (Latino Mix) - 6:07

 Cardboard sleeve
 "Don't Make Me Wait" (Alex & Ber Project Version)
 "Don't Make Me Wait" (Smash Hits Version)

Charts

References

External links
 Music video on YouTube

911 (English group) songs
1996 singles
1996 songs
EMI Records singles
Virgin Records singles
Songs written by Alan Rankine